Bassa people may refer to:
Bassa people (Cameroon)
Bassa people (Liberia)